Le Yucheng (born in June 1963) is a Chinese diplomat and politician. He served as deputy Minister of Foreign Affairs between 2018 and 2022.

Career 
Born in Yangzhou, in 1986 Yucheng graduated in Russian language and literature at the Nanjing Normal University and then started a diplomacy career joining the Soviet Union's East European Department of the Ministry of Foreign Affairs. Among other assignments, he served as Minister Counsellor and Minister at the Embassy of the Russian Federation, Chinese ambassador to Kazakhstan (2013-4) and to India (2014-6), and deputy director of the Central Foreign Affairs Commission. 

In October 2017, Le was elected as an alternate member of the 19th Central Committee of the Chinese Communist Party, and in March 2018, he was appointed deputy Minister of Foreign Affairs. Once considered a potential successor to Foreign Minister Wang Yi, in June 2022 Le was instead demoted to the position of deputy head of the National Radio and Television Administration.

References

External links
 Le Yucheng at Ministry of Foreign Affairs of the People's Republic of China

1963 births
Living people 
Chinese Communist Party politicians 
Politicians from Yangzhou
People from Luannan County
Nanjing Normal University alumni
Chinese diplomats
Ambassadors of China to Kazakhstan
Ambassadors of China to India
Vice-ministers of the Ministry of Foreign Affairs of the People's Republic of China